The Tycoon is a 32-episode American sitcom television series broadcast by ABC. It starred Walter Brennan as the fictitious businessman Walter Andrews, similar to his birth name of Walter Andrew Brennan.

Episodes

References

External links 
 

1964 American television series debuts
1965 American television series endings
1960s American sitcoms
American Broadcasting Company original programming
Black-and-white American television shows
Television series by CBS Studios